The Lakewood Historic District in Birmingham, Alabama is a historic district which was listed on the National Register of Historic Places in 2000.

Location: Roughly bounded by Lee Ave., 82nd St., Spring St., and 80th St.
Year of construction: 1920

It includes work by Birmingham architect George Turner.

Architecture: Mission/Spanish Revival, Tudor Revival, et al.

Historic function: Domestic
Historic subfunction: Single Dwelling
Criteria: architecture/engineering

References

National Register of Historic Places in Jefferson County, Alabama
Historic districts on the National Register of Historic Places in Alabama
Tudor Revival architecture in the United States
Mission Revival architecture in Alabama
Buildings and structures completed in 1920